The American Platinum Eagle is the official platinum bullion coin of the United States. In 1995, Director of the United States Mint Philip N. Diehl, American Numismatic Association President David L. Ganz, and Platinum Guild International Executive Director Jacques Luben began the legislative process of creating the Platinum Eagle. In late 2008, the fractional denominations were discontinued, leaving only the one ounce denomination. The Platinum Eagle is authorized by the United States Congress, and is backed by the United States Mint for weight, content, and purity.

Proof versions of the coins are intended for coin collectors and sold directly to the public whereas the bullion versions are sold only to the Mint's authorized buyers. The proof American Platinum Eagles are unique in the fact that they are the only U.S. bullion coins that have a yearly alternating design. Bullion versions are minted with the same design every year. While minted, the uncirculated Platinum Eagles matched the proof designs and were struck on burnished coin blanks with a "W" mint mark signifying West Point, further distinguishing them from the bullion versions.

Denominations 

As is often the case with bullion coins, the face values of these coins ($10, $25, $50, and $100) are their legal values reflecting their issue and monetized value as coins. They are legal tender for all debts public and private at their face values. The 1 troy oz coin's face value of $100 is the highest to ever appear on a U.S. coin.

The specifications of each denomination are presented below:

Value 
The intrinsic values of the coins are much greater than their face values. In one notable case, this was involved in a money laundering and tax evasion case where defendant Robert Kahre paid employees a wage in bullion coins with a fair intrinsic value but a very low face value, then proceeded to use the low face values to claim zero tax withholdings, allegedly defrauding a total of $120 million.

Yearly designs 

All denominations of the proof American Platinum Eagles carry a yearly design. Since 1998, each design aside from the 2017 reverse commemorating the 20th anniversary of the program, has been part of a themed series:

 1998–2002: The Vistas of Liberty series featured reverse designs depicting a bald eagle in a different landscape of the United States, in a different region of the country.
 2006–2008: The Foundations of Democracy series featured reverse designs representing the three branches of government.
 2009–2014: The Preamble to the Constitution series explored the core concepts of American democracy by highlighting the Preamble to the United States Constitution. The themes for the reverse designs for this program are inspired by narratives prepared by Chief Justice of the United States, John Roberts, at the request of the United States Mint.
 2015–2016: The Torches of Liberty series featured reverse designs from the Artistic Infusion Program which represent the "nation's core values of liberty and freedom".
 2018–2020: The Preamble to the Declaration of Independence series features obverse designs portraying Lady Liberty and handwritten single-word inscriptions from the Declaration of Independence in addition to a new common reverse design. It is the first series to vary obverse designs, all created concurrently by the same designer, rather than reverse designs.
 2021–2025: The First Amendment to the United States Constitution series highlights five freedoms enshrined in the First Amendment.

Tenth anniversary set 

On November 28, 2007, the U.S. Mint announced the American Eagle 10th Anniversary Platinum Coin Set. Intended to commemorate the 10th anniversary of the Platinum Eagle's 1997 launch, the set contained two half-ounce ($50) Platinum Eagles, one matching the 2007 proof strike from earlier in the year and the other carrying an enhanced reverse proof finish with the same design. This first offering of a reverse proof version of the Platinum Eagle followed the prior year's release of similar sets for the American Silver Eagle and American Gold Eagle's 20th anniversary. In addition to being accompanied by a certificate of authenticity, the coins were encased in a domed mahogany box designed to display the coins at an angle.

The set's release on December 13, 2007, at a price of $1,949.95 (around $475 above platinum spot) with a seven-day one-set-per-household limit was met with strong collector interest. First week sales reached 14,682 units, almost half of the maximum ordered mintage of 30,000 units. However, due to fluctuations in the price of platinum, the Mint suspended sales on February 13, 2008, and resumed sales about a month later at $2,649.95. Initially, the increased price constituted a larger premium, around $635, above spot. The following months brought a decline in platinum's price below $1,000 per troy oz, precipitating further suspensions and a final price of $1,249.95. When sales were officially ended on December 31, 2008, over a year after its initial release, the Mint reported total sales of 19,583 units.

Mintage figures 

The figures listed below are the final audited mintages from the U.S. Mint and include coins sold both individually and as part of multi-coin sets. Since 2009, only the $100 (1 troy oz) denomination has been offered.

Bullion 

Bullion Platinum Eagles were not issued from 2009 to 2013. Similarly, in 2015, due to an insufficient quantity of blanks, no bullion Platinum Eagles were issued.

Proof

Uncirculated (burnished)

See also 

 American Gold Eagle
 American Silver Eagle
 American Palladium Eagle
 Canadian Platinum Maple Leaf
 Eagle (U.S. coin)
 Inflation hedge
 Platinum coin
 Platinum as an investment
 Trillion-dollar coin

References

External links 

 United States Mint American Eagle Coin Program page
 United States Mint American Eagle Platinum Bullion Coins page
 United States Mint American Eagle Proof and Uncirculated Coin Program page
 United States Mint American Eagle Coin Images page
  
 American Platinum Eagle Pictures
 Platinum Eagle Guide

Currencies introduced in 1997
Statue of Liberty
Goddess of Liberty on coins
Eagles on coins
Sun on coins
Bullion coins of the United States
Platinum bullion coins